Hwacheon Korea Sports Promotion Foundation Women's Football Club (Korean: 화천 국민체육진흥공단 여자축구단) or simply Hwacheon KSPO WFC is a South Korean women's football team based in Hwacheon County, Gangwon Province. The club competes in the WK League, the top division of women's football in South Korea, and plays its home games at the Hwacheon Stadium. It was founded as Jeonbuk KSPO in 2011, but moved to Hwacheon County ahead of the 2015 season.

Current squad

Backroom staff

Coaching staff
Manager:  Kang Jae-soon
Coach:  Im Jong-guk
Coach:  Kang Seon-mi
Coach:  Lee Jung-eun

Source: Official website

Honours
WK League
Runners-up: 2017

Records

Year-by-year

References

External links 
 Official website 

Women's football clubs in South Korea
Association football clubs established in 2011
Sport in Gangwon Province, South Korea
WK League clubs
2011 establishments in South Korea